The Unipolbrit Komputer 2086 was a Polish version of the home computer Timex Sinclair 2068, produced by a joint venture of the Polish state-owned Unimor and foreign company Polbrit International. Introduced in 1986, the computer had a cost of roughly 190000 zł.

The machine wasn't 100% ZX Spectrum-compatible (like all other Timex Sinclair computers) and a "Spectrum Emulation" cartridge was available (usually bundled).

Technical specifications
CPU

 Zilog Z80A @ 3.50 MHz

ROM

 16 KiB

RAM

 48 KiB

Display

 Timex SCLD chip with Extended Color, Dual Screen and High Resolution screen modes:
 Text: 32×24 characters (8×8 pixels, rendered in graphics mode)
 Graphics: 256×192 pixels, 15 colours (two simultaneous colours - "attributes" - per 8×8 pixels, causing attribute clash)
 Dual Screen: (two 256×192 pixels screens can be placed in memory)
 High Resolution: 512×192 mode with 2 colours (Four palettes: Black & White, Blue & Yellow, Red & Cyan, Magenta & Green).

Sound

 Beeper (1 channel, 10 octaves and 10+ semitones via internal speaker) and AY-3-8912 PSG (three channels)

I/O

 Line audio in/out for external cassette tape storage
 RF television out
 DIN Composite monitor out
 Kempston Joystick input
 Cartridge port
 Centronics printer port.

Storage

 External cassette tape recorder
 External  5" 1/4 or 3" disc drives

Keyboard

 Mechanical keyboard: 42 keys, five function keys, cursor keys

See also
 Elwro 800 Junior
 Mera-Elzab Meritum
 Timex Sinclair 2068

Notes

External links

 Komputer 2086 at HCM. Accessed on April 5, 2008.
 Timex Computer World UK2086 page

Computer-related introductions in 1986
ZX Spectrum clones